Colm Basquel (born 1996) is a Gaelic footballer who plays for Ballyboden St Enda's and the senior Dublin county team.

References

1996 births
Living people
Ballyboden St Enda's Gaelic footballers
Dublin inter-county Gaelic footballers
Sportspeople from Dublin (city)